Atoposea is a genus of moths in the Carposinidae family. It contains the single species Atoposea maxima, which is found in Colombia.

References

Natural History Museum Lepidoptera generic names catalog

Carposinidae
Monotypic moth genera